Alabama House of Representatives, District 5 is one of 105 districts in the Alabama House of Representatives. Its current representative is Danny Crawford. It was created in 1967 and encompasses parts of Limestone County. As of the 2010 census, the district has a population of 48,495, with 75.8% being of legal voting age.

List of representatives

References 

05
05